Eric Anthony Duncan (born December 7, 1984) is an American former professional baseball second baseman and quality control coach for the Miami Marlins of Major League Baseball (MLB). Considered an excellent high school baseball player, Duncan was chosen by the New York Yankees in the first round of the 2003 MLB draft, and became one of the best prospects in baseball. However, injuries and ineffectiveness in minor league baseball prevented Duncan from reaching MLB.

Amateur career
Duncan attended Seton Hall Preparatory School in West Orange, New Jersey. He batted .535 with 10 home runs and 52 runs batted in (RBIs) in his senior year. He committed to attend Louisiana State University (LSU) to play college baseball for the LSU Tigers.

Professional career
The New York Yankees selected Duncan in the first round, with the 27th overall selection, of the 2003 Major League Baseball draft. Prior to the 2005 season, Baseball America named Duncan the Yankees' 2005 top prospect, and the 36th best prospect in baseball. Prior to the 2006 season, Baseball America ranked him the 86th best prospect in baseball.

Duncan was drafted as a third baseman, but was converted into a first baseman while in the Yankee organization, due to the long-term contract of Yankee Alex Rodriguez. However, Duncan began to struggle when he reached Triple-A.

After the 2009 season, the Yankees released Duncan. He spent the 2010 season in the Atlanta Braves organization, playing for the Double-A Mississippi Braves. Duncan signed a minor league contract with an invitation to 2011 spring training with the Colorado Rockies. He was released on April 4. On April 19, Duncan was signed to a minor league contract by the St. Louis Cardinals and assigned to Double-A Springfield. He signed a minor league contract with the Kansas City Royals on November 16, 2011 and was assigned to the Double A Northwest Arkansas Naturals (Texas League). He suffered a torn quadriceps during spring training in 2012 and returned to the field on May 5. In July 2012, he announced his voluntary retirement.

Awards
2003 - 1st Team High School All-American IF
2004 - Midwest League All-Star 3B
2006 - Arizona Fall League All-Star 3B
2006 - Arizona Fall League MVP

Coaching career
Following his retirement, Duncan became a volunteer coach for the Seton Hall Pirates of Seton Hall University. He is also a student at Seton Hall, majoring in political science.

In 2015, the Staten Island Yankees named Duncan as their hitting coach, he returned to the same position in 2016. In 2017, Duncan was promoted to the Tampa Yankees as their hitting coach for the 2017 and 2018 season.

Ducan was hired by the Miami Marlins as their minor league hitting coordinator in January 2019. On April 19, 2019, hitting coach Mike Pagliarulo was fired by the Marlins. The Marlins promoted assistant hitting coach Jeff Livesey to hitting coach and promoted Duncan to fill the role of assistant hitting coach. Duncan was promoted to hitting coach prior to the 2020 season.

References

External links

1984 births
Living people
People from Florham Park, New Jersey
Sportspeople from Morris County, New Jersey
Baseball coaches from New Jersey
Baseball players from New Jersey
Major League Baseball hitting coaches
Miami Marlins coaches
Scranton/Wilkes-Barre Yankees players
Columbus Clippers players
Trenton Thunder players
Tampa Yankees players
Battle Creek Yankees players
Staten Island Yankees players
Mississippi Braves players
Springfield Cardinals players
Seton Hall Preparatory School alumni
Northwest Arkansas Naturals players
Grand Canyon Rafters players
Peoria Saguaros players
Minor league baseball coaches